Destrii or the Primatrix Destriianatos, is a fictional character who appeared in the Doctor Who Magazine comic strip based on the long-running British science fiction television series Doctor Who. She was a companion of the Eighth Doctor.

Character history
Destrii is an amphibious humanoid with scaly skin, claws and a face resembling that of a fish. She first appears in Ophidius, written by Scott Gray and drawn by Martin Geraghty and Robin Smith. The Doctor and Izzy encounter her inside the gargantuan snake-like spacecraft known as Ophidius, which swallowed the TARDIS. She is extremely agile, shows remarkable combat abilities and has a knowledge of Earth's popular culture, but is also initially unprincipled and quick to exhibit violent behavior.

Destrii survived on her own inside the belly of Ophidius for a long time while being pursued by the aliens that control the world-snake. To evade pursuit, she tricks Izzy into using a machine which places their minds in each other's bodies. Destrii tries to pose as Izzy and escape with the Doctor in the TARDIS. The Doctor, seeing her violent tendencies, sees through the deception. However, before the Doctor can do anything to reverse the mind switch, Destrii, in Izzy's body, is seemingly disintegrated by a member of the predatory (but intelligent) species known as the Mobox.

While Izzy is adjusting to the trauma of being trapped in an alien body, she is kidnapped by representatives of Destrii's mother, the Matriax Scalamanthia of the planet Oblivion. Retracing his steps with the help of former companion Fey, the Doctor finds Ophidius anchored in the skies above the Mobox homeworld, and Destrii alive in its jungles. It transpires that the Mobox have the ability to retain the patterns of those they disintegrate and reconstitute them. B'rostt, the Mobox who attacked Destrii, reconstituted Destrii and left her in the jungles to die. Meanwhile B'rostt left to build a new empire on his planet. Destrii, however, was made of sterner stuff and survived, even in Izzy's body. The Doctor takes Destrii with him, determined to find Izzy and restore his companion to her rightful body (Uroboros, DWM #319-#322).

On Oblivion, the Doctor discovers that Destrii is a member of a race that had been genetically manipulated so that no two individuals are alike. Generations ago, the people of Oblivion had looked human until the ruling families attacked their enemies using a plague that stripped its victims' minds bare. The families sealed themselves up to wait out the plague's progress, but discovered that the victims had been transformed instead into living generators of psychic energy who shared a gestalt consciousness. The Horde, as they were known, transformed the ruling families into animalistic humanoids for entertainment and sealed Oblivion from the rest of the universe.

Discovering that Destrii is in Izzy's body, the Horde representatives that kidnapped Izzy switch them back, during which Destrii and Izzy see into each other's minds as the transfer occurs. Izzy sees that Destrii is the daughter of the ruling Matriax, whom the Horde still defers to. However, Destrii was also been raised in the arena, fighting death duels all her life and is feared by everyone except her uncle Jodafra, who looks like a humanoid lion. Jodafra has built a chronon capsule that Destrii used to escape before, but the Matriax brought her back to be wed. When Destrii refuses, the Matriax begins to beat her and, pushed beyond tolerance, Destrii kills her mother. The Horde then descends on Destrii, choosing her as their new leader and transforming her into a psychic energy generator as well.

Destrii is about to destroy the cities of Oblivion with her newfound power when Izzy reminds her of her desire to be free and urges her not to become just one of the monolithic Horde. It is then revealed that Jodafra had allowed Destrii to escape to prove his chronon capsule sound, and while the Matriax and the Horde searched for Destrii, he had perfected a device that would drain the Horde to power the capsule for his escape. Realizing that she has been used, Destrii pours her own energy and that of the Horde into the capsule, reverting to her amphibian form and giving her and her uncle the ability to roam time and space (Oblivion, DWM #323-#328).

The Doctor next encounters Jodafra and Destrii in North America in 1875, near the Lakota village led by Chief Sitting Bull. Jodafra has made an agreement with the other-worldly spirit known as the Windigo to feed it human flesh in exchange for help to navigate the time stream. When Destrii realizes that Jodafra means to sacrifice Lakota children to the Windigo, she destroys the equipment that supports the Windigo, allowing the Doctor and the Lakota to defeat it. Enraged, Jodafra beats Destrii nearly to death, leaving her battered and unconscious body in the snow and departing in his capsule. The Doctor finds Destrii and takes her to Hippocrates Base, a space station hospital, to heal (Bad Blood, DWM #338-#342).

There, Destrii aids the Doctor in repelling a Zeronite attack on the base. While the Doctor acknowledges that Destrii is an "egocentric, immature hellion" with a violent streak "wider than the Gobi Desert", he also feels that there is a decent person underneath that surface. He offers to give her a second chance and show her the universe if she will stick to the rules, and Destrii gladly accepts (Sins of the Fathers, DWM #343-#345).

Their first trip together is to Earth, where Destrii wears a holographic disguise that makes her look human. Together, they foil an invasion by the Cybermen (The Flood, DWM #346-#353). That turned out to be the last regular Eighth Doctor comic strip story in DWM, and the story ends with Destrii and the Doctor walking off into the sunset to as-yet unrevealed further adventures.

Destrii finally returned in 2016's story The Stockbridge Showdown (DWM #500), which reveals that she became Empress of Oblivion and now fights for good causes. She meets up with the Twelfth Doctor and Izzy, who both welcome her and spend time with her after the adventure.

The Flood
In 2007, Panini Books reprinted Destrii's final comic strip adventures in the reprint volume Doctor Who: The Flood. The book includes Scott Gray's original pitch to strip editor Clayton Hickman on how Destrii would transform from a villain to a companion. In his pitch, Gray proposes that, among other things, Destrii be sexually attracted to the Doctor and that her holographic appearance be that of a young black woman whose dreadlocks could be analogous to Destrii's body shape.

In a supporting essay on the "Sins of the Father" comic strip arc, which describes the origins of Destrii's holographic disguise, Gray writes that Destrii's disguise was given red hair instead because the BBC had just announced the Scream of the Shalka webcast adventure, and giving Destrii dreadlocks would have made her look almost identical to the Shalka Doctor's companion, Alison Cheney. Destrii's holographic disguise was based on pop star Ashanti, after Gray saw her in the Buffy the Vampire Slayer episode "First Date".

In "Flood Barriers", an essay by Hickman on the end of the Eighth Doctor comic strips, it is stated that when the 2005 revival of the series was announced, he had originally planned for Destrii to witness the Doctor's regeneration into the Ninth Doctor at the end of The Flood, followed by a "Ninth Doctor: Year One" story arc which would have written Destrii out before the Doctor's adventures resumed with Rose Tyler. This was vetoed by new series producer Russell T Davies, in friendly cooperation with the comic creators.

A letter to Doctor Who Magazine noted that in the Torchwood episode "Greeks Bearing Gifts", an alien calling itself "Mary" bore a strong resemblance to Destrii; the magazine's editors concurred. Later, The Torchwood Archives by Gary Russell specified that Destrii and Mary are from the same system. Destrii's home planet Oblivion is listed along with Devos, Krant and Arcateen IV, V and VI form the Arcan system. The Sarah Jane Adventures episode "Invasion of the Bane" had featured another such alien, "star poet", from Arcateen V.

References

Comics characters introduced in 2000
Doctor Who spin-off companions
Doctor Who comic strip characters
Female characters in comics